This is a list of top 50 singles of 2002 in New Zealand

Chart

Key
 – Single of New Zealand origin

External links
https://www.webcitation.org/6JBCW5Wkj?url=http://www.rianz.org.nz/rianz/chart_annual.asp

2002 in New Zealand music
2002 record charts
Singles 2002